Axa Winterthur is a multinational insurance company. The original company named Winterthur was founded in Winterthur, Switzerland, in 1875. From 1997 to June 2006, Winterthur was a Credit Suisse (CS) subsidiary. Paris-based Axa Insurance entered into a definitive agreement to purchase Winterthur group from CS for approximately CHF 12 billion. From 2007 onward, Axa  merged the companies. Due to the takeover, Axa Insurance took over the brand name and general supervision of the company. Logo changes started to appear in Barcelona during January 2007.

Winterthur has subsidiaries in Germany, the United Kingdom, Belgium, the Netherlands, Hungary, Poland, the Czech Republic, the United States, Slovakia, Japan, Taiwan, Hong Kong, and Luxembourg. In addition, it has subsidiaries in Spain, although Axa are based in Madrid and Winterthur are based in Barcelona.

References

External links
Axa Winterthur
XING
Linkedin
YouTube
Slideshare
Flickr
Axa Group

Gallery

Financial services companies established in 1875
Companies based in Winterthur
Insurance companies of Switzerland